Bobb'e Jacques Thompson  (born February 28, 1996) is an American actor, rapper and comedian.

Career
Thompson is known for playing Tracy Jr. on 30 Rock; his role as child trickster Stanley on That's So Raven and its first spin-off Cory in the House; playing Ronnie Shields in Role Models; the role of Jimmy Mitchell on the short-lived NBC series The Tracy Morgan Show, which lasted for one season from 2003 to 2004; his appearance in commercials for the PlayStation Portable as Marcus Rivers; and for being the host of his own television series Bobb'e Says, which aired on the Cartoon Network block CN Real, before choosing to opt out of a second season to do more films. Thompson also had a recurring role on the hit series Tyler Perry's House of Payne. As a five year old, he performed Bow Wow's song "Bow Wow (That's My Name)", on Showtime at the Apollo hosted by Steve Harvey. The video of this has been uploaded on YouTube and has over 3 million views. In 2011, he had a supporting role as M.J. Williams on Tyler Perry's For Better or Worse. He is currently a cast member on MTV's Wild 'n Out.

Filmography

Film

Television

Music videos

References

External links

 Bobb'e's Instagram

1996 births
Living people
American male film actors
American male child actors
21st-century American male actors
African-American male actors
American male television actors
Comedians from Missouri